Acmaeodera dolorosa is a species of metallic wood-boring beetle in the family Buprestidae. It is found in North America.

Subspecies
 Acmaeodera dolorosa dolorosa Fall, 1899
 Acmaeodera dolorosa liberta Fall, 1922

References

Further reading

 
 
 
 
 

dolorosa
Beetles described in 1899